Church of All Saints is a  Grade I listed church in Tilsworth, Bedfordshire, England. It became a listed building on 3 February 1967.

See also
Grade I listed buildings in Bedfordshire

References

Church of England church buildings in Bedfordshire
Grade I listed churches in Bedfordshire